The Zytek ZJ458 engine is a 4.5-litre, normally-aspirated, V8 racing engine, developed and produced by Zytek for sports car racing. The ZJ458's rev-limit was about 10,000 rpm, and produces its power output of  @ 9,000 rpm, and peak torque of  @ 7,500 rpm.

Applications
Ginetta-Zytek GZ09S
Zytek Z11SN

References

Engines by model
Gasoline engines by model
Zytek engines
V8 engines